Mohammad Daoudiyeh is a Jordanian politician. , he serves as Minister of Agriculture in Bisher Al-Khasawneh's Cabinet led by Prime Minister Bisher Al-Khasawneh.

References 

Living people
Year of birth missing (living people)
Place of birth missing (living people)
Agriculture ministers of Jordan